The Konica F was the first 35 mm SLR camera produced by Konishiroku, released in February 1960.

It featured a built-in light metering system to set the correct exposure. The meter utilized a large selenium cell panel on the front of the viewfinder prism to detect light levels. This type sensor cell generates its own small electric current, so the metering system does not require a battery. On the other hand, selenium cells are known to degrade over time, losing accuracy or eventually failing. Many cameras and handheld meters relied upon selenium cells at one time, but they were gradually replaced by CdS and other types of cells that require a battery but tend to give long-term reliability. Between 600 and 1500 total Konica Fs were produced, making it a highly sought-after camera.

A year prior to the Konica F's introduction, a prototype of that camera was displayed at a photo show in Japan. At that time it was called the KonicaFlex. The only difference between the two was the mounting of the selenium light meter: While the Konica F meter was built into the front of the prism housing, that of the KonicaFlex was a flip-up type meter carried over from the Konica IIIM rangefinder of 1957.

Features 
The Konica F used a new design of Konishiroku-made shutter called the Hi Synchro (also High Synchro), the predecessor to the Copal Square shutter (descendants of which are almost universally used in film and digital SLRs in the 21st century). Konishiroku produced a highly reliable, vertically running, metal bladed shutter. Although not a Copal shutter, the new technology was showcased in the Konica F. Contemporary cameras (and many later ones) were using horizontal running, cloth shutters and older designs that were less durable.

The Konishiroku shutter featured 1/2000 speed. This was the highest shutter speed attained to date in a 35 mm SLR camera. Typical cameras of the time commonly used 1/250 or 1/500 as maximum speeds. Some premium models used 1/1000. In late 1960, Canon released the Canonflex R2000, the second model to achieve 1/2000 shutter speed, but it still used the older, horizontally running, cloth shutter. No subsequent Konica 35 mm SLR camera ever featured faster than 1/1000 shutter speed. Most used the Copal Square variant of the shutter and many had 1/125 flash sync. There was even a Copal Square "Hi Syncho" used in the Konica T3 in the mid-1970s, known for its reliability.

The Konica F also featured a 1/125 flash sync, whereas other cameras of the time offered 1/30 to 1/60 sync.

Konishiroku had very limited means of distribution for the new camera outside Japan. They were mostly sold by special order and through catalogs. A few years later, the company's 35 mm rangefinder cameras were sold under the Wards brand in the United States. Montgomery Ward was a major catalog seller of photographic equipment at that time, and many Konica items appeared in their catalogs during the late 1950s and early 1960s. The small number of Konica Fs on store shelves resulted in the model being largely unnoticed, with the  Canonflex R2000 considered by many to be the first 35 mm SLR to achieve 1/2000 shutter speed, despite the Konica F preceding it by eight months.

The pentaprism was removable and could be replaced with an optional waist level finder. The focusing screen of the F has multiple focus aids: a Fresnel focused light on a matte area, a diaprism, and a split image center spot. This wealth of focus was unusual for cameras 1960 and wasn't standard on another Konica until the mid-1970s.

Lenses by Konica 
There were four new Hexanon lenses offered along with the F: 
The normal lens was a 52 mm f1.4 with a 49 mm filter thread (a similar lens was offered later with a 55 mm thread). 
A wide-angle 35 mm f2.0, 
telephoto 85 mm f1.8 and 135 mm f2.8 lenses were also offered. 

The 35, 52 and 85 mm all had a linkage that juts out from the side of the lens, that inter-connects with a lever on the front of the camera, to register the lens' aperture setting with the camera's metering system. Because of this linkage interface, lenses sold with later Konica early mount cameras are not easily fitted onto the F, and vice versa, although they all share the same bayonet mount. In 1965, Konica introduced the Auto-Reflex line of cameras and lenses, which do not share the same bayonet mount as the F and its immediate successors, up to 1964's FM model.

The 135 mm Hexanon for the F had a manual aperture, but the other lenses featured what was referred to as "fully automatic" aperture in the 1960s. This is not as automated as apertures eventually became. At that time it meant the aperture diaphragm was held fully open during focusing, to make for a brighter viewfinder and render a shallow depth of field, both of which helped with focusing. Once the shutter release button was pressed, the aperture was allowed to snap down to the pre-selected setting, before the shutter opened to expose the film. Further, the aperture re-opened automatically after the shutter closed. All this happened in the instant the exposure was made, while the reflex mirror was also cycling up out of the way, then back down to the viewing position.

Weblink 
Description of Metal shutters used by Konica on konicafiles.com

References 

F
Cameras introduced in 1960